Willy Holzmüller (3 March 1931 – 20 September 2021) was a German footballer. He played in one match for the East Germany national football team in 1957.

References

External links
 

1931 births
2021 deaths
East German footballers
East Germany international footballers
People from Glauchau
Association footballers not categorized by position
Footballers from Saxony